Kentucky Route 453 (KY 453) is a  state highway in Kentucky that runs from The Trace at the northern entrance of Land Between the Lakes National Recreation Area south of Grand Rivers to U.S. Route 60 and North Court Street in Smithland.

Route description

KY 453 starts in Smithland in Livingston County at an intersection with U.S. Route 60 (US 60). It goes on a southeasterly path out of town, and has an intersection with Interstate 24 (I-24)/Interstate 69 (I-69), and then US 62 and US 641 in the Lake City–Grand Rivers vicinity, the village between the two lakes, Lake Barkley (Cumberland River) to the east, and Kentucky Lake (Tennessee River) to the west. The highway ends at the bridge over the canal connecting the lakes just south of the county line into Lyon County, for the road continuing south of that bridge enters the U.S. Forest Service-owned Land Between the Lakes National Recreation Area, and becomes "The Trace".

History
Before the Land Between The Lakes Recreation Area was in the hands of the USDA, the Tennessee Valley Authority owned the recreation area, and KY 453 continued through the area up to the Tennessee state line.

Major intersections

References

External links

0453
Transportation in Lyon County, Kentucky
Transportation in Livingston County, Kentucky